Shapwick  may refer to:
 Shapwick, Dorset, England
 Shapwick, Somerset, England
 The Shapwick Hoard, a Roman coin discovery in Shapwick, Somerset